Kensington is a town in Montgomery County, Maryland, United States. The population was 2,213 at the 2010 United States Census. Greater Kensington encompasses the entire 20895 ZIP code, with a population of 19,054.

History 

The area around the Rock Creek basin where Kensington is located was primarily agricultural until 1873, when the B&O Railroad completed the Metropolitan Branch which traversed Montgomery County. A community arose where the new railroad line intersected the old Rockville-to-Bladensburg road. This early settlement was first known as Knowles Station.  In the early 1890s, Washington, D.C. developer Brainard Warner began purchasing land parcels to build a planned Victorian community, complete with church, library and a local newspaper. Fascinated by a recent trip to London, Warner named his subdivision Kensington Park, the 10th and largest subdivision in the area which became the Town of Kensington. Upon incorporation in 1894, Warner convinced the Mayor and Council to name the town Kensington. The historic core of Kensington was listed on the National Register of Historic Places, as the Kensington Historic District in 1980.

Originally a farming community at Knowles Station, Kensington developed into a summer refuge for Washington, D.C., residents wishing to escape the capital's humid summers. As years passed and its residents increasingly remained year round, Kensington evolved into a commuter suburb.  The large southernmost section originally mapped out by Warner remains largely unchanged since inception, and is a historically preserved zone.  Indeed, the only major changes in the town's basic layout have been the bridging over of the original railroad crossing in 1937, and the extension and widening of Connecticut Avenue, the town's main thoroughfare, in 1957.

In March 1975, Kensington gained attention regionally due to the disappearance of Sheila and Katherine Lyon. The sisters walked to Wheaton Plaza, a local shopping mall where they were seen by witnesses including their brother. However, they never returned home. The case was not resolved until 2017.

The town gained national attention three times in a 10-month span early in the 21st century as a result of events which occurred within a mere quarter-mile radius. In December 2001, the town responded to complaints from anonymous citizens by banning Santa Claus from the annual holiday parade. Protesters arrived at the parade en masse, including dozens of Santas riding everything from motorcycles to fire trucks.  Eight months later, an Amtrak train derailed adjacent to the town center when the tracks separated at an overheated joint, injuring 72 people, though there were no fatalities. Then, on October 2, 2002, Lori Ann Lewis-Rivera became the fifth victim of the snipers who terrorized the Washington area that month, while cleaning her car at a Kensington gas station. (See Beltway sniper attacks.)

Kensington again received national attention in November 2020, when a train bridge that crosses the 495 Beltway ahead of the Washington D.C. Temple
was vandalised with the message "Surrender Donald". Many thought that this was a response to then-President Donald Trump's refusal to concede in the 2020 United States presidential election.

Geography

Kensington is located in Montgomery County, northwest of Silver Spring, northeast of Bethesda, west of Wheaton and southeast of Rockville. Its latitude is 39°1′48″N, longitude 77°4′30″W.

While the town proper is but one-half square mile in size, the Kensington Post Office serves a much larger area and extends into North Bethesda and the Wheaton Planning District. Residents within this ZIP code (20895) generally refer to Kensington as their home town even though they technically do not reside in "The Town of Kensington".

The look and white color of the Washington D.C. Temple located in Greater Kensington, coupled with its location near the Capital Beltway, have made it a local landmark. D.C.-area traffic reports often refer to the "Mormon temple" or "temple".

Demographics

2010 census
As of the census of 2010, there were 2,213 people, 870 households, and 563 families residing in the town. The racial makeup of the town was 82.0% White, 6.1% African American, 0.1% Native American, 5.7% Asian, 0.1% Pacific Islander, 2.8% from other races, and 3.2% from two or more races. Hispanic or Latino of any race were 6.4% of the population.

There were 870 households, of which 33.7% had children under the age of 18 living with them, 51.8% were married couples living together, 10.0% had a female householder with no husband present, 2.9% had a male householder with no wife present, and 35.3% were non-families. 27.1% of all households were made up of individuals, and 10.5% had someone living alone who was 65 years of age or older. The average household size was 2.54 and the average family size was 3.17.

The median age in the town was 42.1 years. 26.2% of residents were under the age of 18; 5% were between the ages of 18 and 24; 24% were from 25 to 44; 30% were from 45 to 64; and 14.8% were 65 years of age or older. The gender makeup of the town was 47.6% male and 52.4% female.

2000 census
As of the census of 2000, the median income for a household in the town was $76,716, and the median income for a family was $96,394. Males had a median income of $65,804 versus $41,364 for females. The per capita income for the town was $35,919.  About 0.9% of families and 2.1% of the population were below the poverty line, including none of those under age 18 and 1.3% of those age 65 or over.

Commerce

Kensington is primarily a bedroom community for workers who commute to jobs in the Washington, D.C., area, but it is not without its own commercial enterprises, which include "Antique Row" on Howard Avenue, the West Howard Antique District, and Kaiser-Permanente's Kensington facility, plus art shops, restaurants, supermarkets, auto repair shops, hardware stores, and others. The town hosts a website, Explore Kensington, listing businesses, services, news and events in the Town of Kensington.

The Town of Kensington hosts a farmer's market on Saturdays between 9am and 1pm at the historical train station which is still in use today as part of the MARC commuter train network. The town is home to the Noyes Library for Young Children.

Events 
The Kensington Day of the Book Festival or World Book Day is celebrated on the Sunday closest to April 23.  This afternoon street festival is celebrated with live music, author readings, open mic, activities for children and adults, storytellers, and books. Local authors, book artists, publishers, booksellers, and literary groups line Howard Ave in Historic Old Town Kensington to show, sell, and discuss their works. In conjunction is the Gala Craft Fair on Armory Avenue featuring crafts.

The Kensington 8K Race is held in late September, and has since 1994.  Attracting runners and walkers from across the D.C. region, the event comprises three distances (8 km, 2 mi, and 1 km), running through the historic core of the Town and along nearby Beach Drive and in the Rock Creek Hills neighborhood.

Each year Kensington holds a Labor Day Parade.

Law and government 

A mayoral election is held in even-numbered years for a two-year term. Kensington has a four-member council, elected for two-year terms. Terms are staggered. Every year there are two council seats up for election.  For contested elections, election winners are noted in bold.

The 2021 Kensington Town Election was held on June 7, 2021 

Conor D. Crimmins, Council Member, 318 votes

Darin R. Bartram, Council Member, 246 votes

Tim Willard, Council Member, 151 votes

The 2020 Kensington Town Election was held on June 1, 2020 

Tracey Furman, Mayor, 420 votes

Peter Fosselman, Mayor, 368 votes

Bridget Hill-Zayat, Council Member, 549 votes

Nate Engle, Council Member, 511 votes

Jon Gerson, Council Member, 356 votes

The 2019 Kensington Town Election was held on June 3, 2019 

Darin R. Bartram, Council Member, 72 votes

Conor D. Crimmins, Council Member, 71 votes

The 2018 Kensington Town Election was held on June 4, 2018 

Tracey Furman, Mayor, 147 votes

Bridget Hill-Zayat, Council Member, 113 votes

Duane L. Rollins, Council Member, 136 votes

The 2017 Kensington Town Election was held on June 5, 2017 

Darin R. Bartram, Council Member, 210 votes

Conor D. Crimmins, Council Member, 233 votes

Tom H. Rodriguez, Council Member, 207 votes

The 2016 Kensington Town Election was held on June 6, 2016 

Tracey Furman, Mayor, 129 votes

Duane Rollins, Councilman, 125 votes

Sean McMullen, Councilman, 108 votes

The 2015 Kensington Town Election was held on June 1, 2015

Tom Rodriguez, Councilman, 158 votes

Darin Bartram, Councilman, 157 votes

Education

The Town of Kensington is served by the Montgomery County Public Schools system, specifically:
 Kensington-Parkwood Elementary School
 North Bethesda Middle School
 Walter Johnson High School

Montgomery County Public Schools serving Greater Kensington include:
 Garrett Park Elementary School
 Kensington-Parkwood Elementary School
 North Chevy Chase Elementary School
 Oakland Terrace Elementary School
 Rock View Elementary School
 Newport Mill Middle School
 North Bethesda Middle School
 Tilden Middle School (Formally Charles W. Woodward)
 Silver Creek Middle School
 Albert Einstein High School
 Bethesda-Chevy Chase High School
 Walter Johnson High School

Kensington is also home to:
 Kensington Nursery School
 Holy Redeemer School, a Roman Catholic parochial school
 Grace Episcopal Day School
 Academy of the Holy Cross, an all-girls Roman Catholic high school
Kensington parkrun, a free, timed 5K run/walk that occurs every Saturday at 9:00am.

Transportation

Four state highways serve Kensington. The most prominent of these is Maryland Route 185 (Connecticut Avenue), which provides the most direct link between Kensington and both Interstate 495 (the Capital Beltway) and Washington, D.C. The other major state highway serving the town is Maryland Route 193, which follows University Boulevard and Greenbelt Road east from Kensington across the northern and northeastern suburbs of Washington, D.C. The other two state highways, Maryland Route 192 and Maryland Route 547, are short connectors linking Kensington to nearby communities.

The Marc Brunswick Line serves Kensington at Kensington station (Maryland). It connects downtown Kensington with Washington, D.C. via Washington Union Station, as well as with northern Maryland including Harpers Ferry, West Virginia and Point of Rocks, Maryland.

Multiple Ride On (bus) Service Kensington, including lines 4, 5, 33, 34, and 37. These buses take passengers from downtown Kensington to a variety of Destinations including Silver Spring, Maryland, Twinbrook (Rockville, Maryland), Glenmont station, Medical Center station (Washington Metro), Aspen Hill, Maryland, Friendship Heights, Wheaton, Maryland.

Places of worship 
 Cedar Lane Unitarian Universalist Church
 Christ Episcopal Church
 First Baptist Church, Kengar
 Holy Redeemer Catholic Church
 Jehovah's Witnesses Kensington Kingdom Hall
 Kensington Baptist Church
 Lee Memorial AME Church
 Saint Paul's United Methodist Church
 Temple Emmanuel
 Warner Memorial Presbyterian Church
 Washington D.C. Temple of the Church of Jesus Christ of Latter-day Saints
 Kensington Ward of The Church of Jesus Christ of Latter-day Saints

See also
 Kensington Station
 List of people from the Washington, D.C. metropolitan area

References 

Kensington, a Picture History. Kensington (MD), Kensington Business District Association, 1994.

External links

 Town of Kensington
 Kensington Historical Society
 KBDA - Kensington Business District Association
 Noyes Library

1894 establishments in Maryland
 
Populated places established in 1894
Towns in Maryland
Towns in Montgomery County, Maryland